Tabula Rasa is the sixth full-length studio album by the German industrial band Einstürzende Neubauten, released in 1993 through Mute Records worldwide and through the band's own label Potomak in Germany, Austria and Switzerland.

Anita Lane joins Blixa Bargeld on vocals for the song "Blume."

Reception 

Trouser Press described the album as "a gripping blend of stately seduction and brutality that sounds like the masterpiece Einstürzende Neubauten was born to make."

Track listing 
All songs written and arranged by Blixa Bargeld, Mark Chung, F. M. Einheit, Alexander Hacke and N. U. Unruh,  copyright Freibank Music.
 "Die Interimsliebenden" ("The Interim Lovers") - 7:41
 "Zebulon" - 3:43
 "Blume" ("Flower") - 4:33
 "12305(te Nacht)" ("12305th Night") - 4:13
 "Sie" (She) - 6:08
 "Wüste" ("Desert") - 4:07
 "Headcleaner" - 9:55
 I. "Zentrifuge" / "Stabs" / "Rotlichtachse" / "Propaganda" / "Aufmarsch" ("Centrifuge" / "Stabs" / "Red Light Axis" / "Propaganda" / "Deployment")
 II. "Einhorn" ("Unicorn")
 III. "Marschlied" ("Marching Song")
 "Headcleaner" - 5:12
 "Das Gleissen / Schlacht" ("The Track / Battle")
 IV. "Lyrischer Rückzug" ("Lyric Retreat")

"Headcleaner" contains a sample of, and interpolates modified lyrics from the Beatles song "All You Need Is Love", changing the refrain to: "All you need is headcleaner."

Personnel
Einstürzende Neubauten
Blixa Bargeld - lead vocals
Alexander Hacke - guitar, backing vocals
F. M. Einheit - percussion, backing vocals, keyboards
Mark Chung - bass, backing vocals
N. U. Unruh - percussion, backing vocals

Production
Produced by E. N. & Jon Caffery
Recorded and engineered by Jon Caffery and Boris Wilsdorf
Mixed by Jon Caffery

References

Einstürzende Neubauten albums
1993 albums
Mute Records albums